Nudge theory is a concept in behavioral economics, decision making, behavioral policy, social psychology, consumer behavior, and related behavioral sciences that proposes adaptive designs of the decision environment (choice architecture) as ways to influence the behavior and decision-making of groups or individuals. Nudging contrasts with other ways to achieve compliance, such as education, legislation or enforcement.
 
The nudge concept was popularized in the 2008 book Nudge: Improving Decisions About Health, Wealth, and Happiness, by behavioral economist Richard Thaler and legal scholar Cass Sunstein, two American scholars at the University of Chicago. It has influenced British and American politicians. Several nudge units exist around the world at the national level (UK, Germany, Japan, and others) as well as at the international level (e.g. World Bank, UN, and the European Commission). It is disputed whether "nudge theory" is a recent novel development in behavioral economics or merely a new term for one of many methods for influencing behavior, investigated in the science of behavior analysis.

There have been some controversies regarding effectiveness of nudges. Maier et al. wrote that, after correcting the publication bias found by Mertens et al., there is no evidence that nudging would have any effect. However, nudging is an umbrella term referring to many techniques, and skeptics of nudging also believe that it is possible that some nudges (e.g. default effect) can be sometimes highly effective and some nudges have minimal if any effect, and call for future work that shift away from investigating average effects but focus on moderators instead. Furthermore, a meta analysis of all unpublished nudging studies carried by nudge units with over 23 million individuals in United Kingdom and United States found support for many nudges, but with substantially weaker effects than effects found in published studies. Moreover, some researchers criticized "one-nudge-for-all" approach and advocated for more studies and implementations of personalized nudging (based on individual differences), which appear to be substantially more effective, with more robust and consistent evidence base.

Definition of a nudge
The first formulation of the term nudge and associated principles was developed in cybernetics by James Wilk before 1995 and described by Brunel University academic D. J. Stewart as "the art of the nudge" (sometimes referred to as micronudges). It also drew on methodological influences from clinical psychotherapy tracing back to Gregory Bateson, including contributions from Milton Erickson, Watzlawick, Weakland and Fisch, and Bill O'Hanlon. In this variant, the nudge is a microtargeted design geared towards a specific group of people, irrespective of the scale of intended intervention.

In 2008, Richard Thaler and Cass Sunstein's book Nudge: Improving Decisions About Health, Wealth, and Happiness brought nudge theory to prominence. The authors refer to the influencing of behaviour without coercion as libertarian paternalism and the influencers as choice architects.

Thaler and Sunstein defined their concept as the following:

In this form, drawing on behavioral economics, the nudge is more generally applied in order to influence behaviour.

One of the most frequently cited examples of a nudge is the etching of the image of a housefly into the men's room urinals at Amsterdam's Schiphol Airport, which is intended to "improve the aim." The book also gained a following among US and UK politicians, in the private sector and in public health.

Overview
A nudge makes it more likely that an individual will make a particular choice, or behave in a particular way, by altering the environment so that automatic cognitive processes are triggered to favour the desired outcome.

An individual's behaviour is not always in alignment with their intentions (a discrepancy known as a value-action gap). It is common knowledge that humans are not fully rational beings; that is, people will often do something that is not in their own self-interest, even when they are aware that their actions are not in their best interest. As an example, when hungry, people who diet often underestimate their ability to lose weight, and their intentions to eat healthy can be temporarily weakened until they are satiated.

Nobel Laureate Daniel Kahneman describes two distinct systems for processing information as to why people sometimes act against their own self-interest: System 1 is fast, automatic, and highly susceptible to environmental influences; System 2 processing is slow, reflective, and takes into account explicit goals and intentions. When situations are overly complex or overwhelming for an individual's cognitive capacity, or when an individual is faced with time-constraints or other pressures, System 1 processing takes over decision-making. System 1 processing relies on various judgmental heuristics to make decisions, resulting in faster decisions. Unfortunately, this can also lead to suboptimal decisions. In fact, Thaler and Sunstein trace maladaptive behaviour to situations in which System 1 processing overrides an individual's explicit values and goals. It is well documented that habitual behaviour is resistant to change without a disruption to the environmental cues that trigger that behaviour.

Nudging techniques aim to use judgmental heuristics to the advantage of the party that is creating the set of choices. In other words, a nudge alters the environment so that when heuristic, or System 1, decision-making is used, the resulting choice will be the most positive or desired outcome. An example of such a nudge is switching the placement of junk food in a store, so that fruit and other healthy options are located next to the cash register, while junk food is relocated to another part of the store.

Types of nudges
Nudges are small changes in the environment that are easy and inexpensive to implement. Several different techniques exist for nudging, including defaults, social-proof heuristics, and increasing the salience of the desired option.

A default option is the option that an individual automatically receives if they do nothing. People are more likely to choose a particular option if it is the default option. For example, Pichert & Katsikopoulos (2008) found that a greater number of consumers chose the renewable energy option for electricity when it was offered as the default option.

A social-proof heuristic refers to the tendency for individuals to look at the behavior of other people to help guide their own behavior. Studies have found some success in using social-proof heuristics to nudge individuals to make healthier food choices.

When an individual's attention is drawn towards a particular option, that option will become more salient to the individual and they will be more likely to choose that option. As an example, in snack shops at train stations in the Netherlands, consumers purchased more fruit and healthy snack options when they were relocated next to the cash register. Since then, other similar studies have been made regarding the placement of healthier food options close to the checkout counter and the effect on the consuming behavior of the customers and this is now considered an effective and well-accepted nudge.

Application of theory
Behavioral insights and nudges are currently used in many countries around the world.

Government 

There are various notable examples of government applications of nudge theory.

During their terms, both U.K. Prime Minister David Cameron and U.S. President Barack Obama may have sought to employ nudge theory to advance domestic policy goals in their respective countries. In 2008, the United States appointed Cass Sunstein, who helped develop the theory, as administrator of the Office of Information and Regulatory Affairs. In 2010, the British Behavioural Insights Team, or "Nudge Unit," was established at the British Cabinet Office and headed by psychologist David Halpern.

In Australia, the state Government of New South Wales established a Nudge Unit of its own in 2012. In 2016, the federal government followed suit, forming the Behavioural Economics Team of Australia (BETA) as the "central unit for applying behavioural insights...to public policy."

In 2020, the British government of Boris Johnson decided to rely on nudge theory to fight the coronavirus pandemic, with Chief Scientific Adviser Patrick Vallance seeking to encourage “herd immunity” with this strategy.

Business 
Nudge theory has also been applied to business management and corporate culture.

For instance, nudge is applied to health, safety, and environment (HSE) with the primary goals of achieving a "zero accident culture." The concept is also used as a key component in a lot of human-resources software.

Particular forerunners in the application of nudge theory in corporate settings are top Silicon Valley companies. These companies are using nudges in various forms to increase productivity and happiness of employees. Recently, more companies are gaining interest in using what is called "nudge management" to improve the productivity of their white-collar workers.

Healthcare 
Lately, nudge theory has also been used in different ways to help healthcare professionals make more deliberate decisions in numerous areas. For example, nudging has been used as a way to improve hand hygiene among healthcare workers to decrease the number of healthcare-associated infections. It has also been used as a way to make fluid administration a more thought-out decision in intensive care units, with the intention of reducing well known complications of fluid overload.

Fundraising 
Nudge theory can also be applied to fundraising, helping to increase donor contributions and increase continuous donations from the same individual, as well as to entice new donors to give.

There are some simple strategies used when applying nudge theory to this area. The first strategy is to make donating easy: creating default settings that automatically enroll a donor for continuous giving or prompts them to give every so often encourages individuals to continue giving. The second strategy to increase donors is to make giving more enticing, which can include increasing a person's motivation to give through rewards, personalized messages, or focusing on their interests. Personalized messages, small thank-you gifts, and demonstrating the impact one's donation can have on others, have been shown to be more effective when increasing donations. Another strategy helpful to increasing donors is using social influence, as people are very influenced by group norms. By allowing donors to become visible to the public and increasing their identifiability, other individuals will be more inclined to give as they conform to the social norms around them. Using peer effects has been shown to increase donations. Finally, timing is important: many studies have demonstrated that there are specific times when individuals are more likely to give, for example during holidays.

Although many nudging theories have been useful to increase donations and donors, many scholars question the ethics of using such techniques on the population. Ruehle et al. (2020), state that one has to always consider an individual's autonomy when designing nudges for a fundraising campaign. They state that the power of others behind messaging and potentially intrusive prompting can cause concern and may be seen as manipulative of donor's autonomy.

AI and Algorithmic Nudging 
Nudges are used at many levels in AI algorithms, for example recommender systems, and their consequences are still being investigated. Two articles appeared in Minds & Machines in 2018 addressed the relation between nudges and Artificial Intelligence, explaining how persuasion and psychometrics can be used by personalised targeting algorithms to influence individual and collective behaviour, sometimes also in unintended ways.  
 
 
In 2020 an article in AI & Society addressed the use of this technology in Algorithmic Regulation.

A piece in the Harvard Business Review published in 2021 was one of the first articles to coin the term "Algorithmic Nudging" (see also Algorithmic Management). The author stresses "Companies are increasingly using algorithms to manage and control individuals not by force, but rather by nudging them into desirable behavior — in other words, learning from their personalized data and altering their choices in some subtle way."

While the concept builds on the work by University of Chicago economist Richard Thaler and Harvard Law School professor Cass Sunstein, "due to recent advances in AI and machine learning, algorithmic nudging is much more powerful than its non-algorithmic counterpart. With so much data about workers’ behavioral patterns at their fingertips, companies can now develop personalized strategies for changing individuals’ decisions and behaviors at large scale. These algorithms can be adjusted in real-time, making the approach even more effective."

Tourism 
One concern researchers in enjoyment-focused contexts, such as tourism, raised is a gap between attitude, intention and behaviour because tourists seek pleasure. However, several empirical pieces of evidence in the tourism show the nudge theory's high effectiveness in reducing the burden of tourists' activities on the environment. For instance, tourists consumed more ethical foods, selected more sustainable hotels, reused towels and bed linen during hotel stays, increased their intentions to reduce their energy consumption, increased the adoption of tourists' voluntary carbon offsetting and many other examples.

Critique
The evidence on nudging having any effect has been criticized as "limited", so Mertens et al. produced a comprehensive meta-analysis. They found that nudging is effective but there is a moderate publication bias. Later Maier et al. computed that, after correcting for this publication bias appropriately, there is no evidence that nudging would have any effect.

Tammy Boyce, from the public health foundation The King's Fund, has said: "We need to move away from short-term, politically motivated initiatives such as the 'nudging people' idea, which are not based on any good evidence and don't help people make long-term behaviour changes." Likewise, Mols et al. (2015), acknowledge nudges may at times be useful, but argue that covert nudges offer limited scope for securing lasting behavior change.

Cass Sunstein has responded to criticism at length in his 2016 book, The Ethics of Influence: Government in the Age of Behavioral Science, making the case in favor of nudging, against charges that nudges diminish autonomy, threaten dignity, violate liberties, or reduce welfare. He previously defended nudge theory in his 2014 book Why Nudge?: The Politics of Libertarian Paternalism by arguing that choice architecture is inevitable and that some form of paternalism cannot be avoided.

Ethicists have debated nudge theory rigorously. These charges have been made by various participants in the debate from Bovens (2009)  to Goodwin (2012). Wilkinson, for example, charges nudges for being manipulative, while others such as Yeung (2012) question their scientific credibility.

Public opinion on the ethicality of nudges has also been shown to be susceptible to “partisan nudge bias.” Research from David Tannenbaum, Craig R. Fox, and Todd Rogers (2017) found that adults and policymakers in the United States believed behavioral policies to be more ethical when they aligned with their own political leanings. Conversely, people took these same mechanisms to be more unethical when they differed from their politics. The researchers also found that nudges are not inherently partisan: when evaluating behavioral policies absent of political cues, people across the political spectrum were alike in their assessments.

Some, such as Hausman and Welch (2010) as well as Roberts (2018) have inquired whether nudging should be permissible on grounds of distributive justice. Though Roberts (2018) argued that nudges do not benefit vulnerable, low-income individuals as much as individuals who are less vulnerable, some empirical research suggests that nudges benefit low-income and low-SES people most, if anything increasing distributive justice. Lepenies and Malecka (2015) have questioned whether nudges are compatible with the rule of law. Similarly, legal scholars have discussed the role of nudges and the law.

Behavioral economists such as Bob Sugden have pointed out that the underlying normative benchmark of nudging is still homo economicus, despite the proponents' claim to the contrary.

It has been remarked that nudging is also a euphemism for psychological manipulation as practiced in social engineering.

There exists an anticipation and, simultaneously, implicit criticism of the nudge theory in works of Hungarian social psychologists Ferenc Mérei and László Garai, who emphasize the active participation in the nudge of its target.

The authors of a book titled Neuroliberalism: Behavioural Government in the Twenty-First Century (2017), argue that, while there is much value and diversity in behavioural approaches to government, there are significant ethical issues, including the danger of the neurological sciences being co-opted to the needs of neo-liberal economics.

See also

 Default effect
 List of cognitive biases
 Negarchy
 Psychohistory (fictional)
 Thinking, Fast and Slow
 Race to the Top
Dark pattern

References

Further reading 

 
 

 
 

 
Behavioral economics
Behavioural sciences
Cognitive biases
Psychological theories
Psychological manipulation